Hutchinson Central Technical High School, informally known as Hutch-Tech, is a high school in the City of Buffalo, New York. Its founding on September 14, 1904 under the name Mechanics Arts High School marked the beginning of technical education on the secondary level in the city of Buffalo. The current principal is Gabrielle Morquecho.

History

The school was first housed in the then Elementary School No. 11 on Elm Street near Clinton Street.  Daniel Upton, the founder of the school and its first principal, began operations with a faculty of four teachers and a pupil registration of sixty-four.

In September 1905, the school's name was changed to Technical High School, pending the move to a new building to be built on Cedar Street and Clinton Ave; the cornerstone was laid on November 14, 1912. The Cedar Street building opened on July 14, 1918 with an enrollment of 1009 students, 863 boys and 146 girls. It offered evening classes, the first of its kind in Buffalo at the time.

The program of studies at Technical High School differed from that of other Buffalo high schools, in its introduction of Industrial Chemistry Machine Design, Engineering College Preparatory, Electrical, Commercial Art and Building Design and Construction to the program of the high school at this point.

The school received a charter from the Regents of the State of New York (now the New York State Education Department) under the name Technical High School of Buffalo in 1918, and remained in this building until 1954. In the spring of 1921, Tech began issuing entrance exams and became what is now known as a magnet school, even though with its course load it would normally fall into the classification of a vocational-technical school.  That practice still continues today to help select classes, which now consist of roughly 200-300 students.

The school was in great demand during its forty years of instruction at this location. Most of Technical High School's equipment was transferred to the building formerly occupied by Hutchinson Central High School. This building, located at South Elmwood Avenue and Chippewa Street, was completely renovated, remodeled and repainted. It is located within the boundaries of the West Village Historic District.

Hutch-Tech was one of the world's first high schools with a digital computer, acquiring an IBM 1620 (Level C) in 1961.  This computer, with 20,000 BCD words of memory, was quite advanced for the time, and classes were taught in assembly language, symbolic programming, Fortran, COBOL, and numerical analysis.  Many Hutch-Tech graduates from the 1960s became pioneers in computing.  Perhaps the best known of these is astronomer and computer security expert Clifford Stoll.

The curriculum has been revamped and expanded continuously over the second half of the 20th century, for entrance into schools of engineering and or the training of technicians for entry-level positions in current technical fields. The programs the school now offers includes bio-chemical technology, computer technology, and engineering technology. Instruction in electricity and electronics is also provided. Hutch-Tech also offers a selection of college prep courses including Advanced Placement that both helped their major, and helped them meet their general education requirements that most colleges require. The courses include AP English Language and Composition, AP English Literature and Composition, AP Biology, AP Chemistry, AP Calculus, AP Spanish Language, AP Physics-C, and AP United States History.

More recently the building was set for renovation as part of a citywide plan to renovate dozen of schools in the city of Buffalo. The renovation took place from the summer of 2005 until the summer of 2007. The "New" building has more and updated classrooms with Promethean Ltd smart boards, a brand new gymnasium, new engineering and electrical equipment, and new science rooms. While the building was being renovated, school operations took place at Kensington High School on the city's East Side.

At the end of the 2010 School Year, David Greco retired
after nearly fifteen years of service as head administrator at Hutch-Tech, and nearly twenty-five years as a history teacher, and administrator elsewhere, including Bennett High School, Buffalo Traditional, and others. This is five years later than his original retirement date of 2005, but Greco made a promise to see the renovations through, and see the students back to the building on South Elmwood. Greco's successor was Sabatino Cimato.

In November 2015, Sabatino Cimato was appointed to associate superintendent in charge of leadership for Buffalo Public Schools. Dr. Gabrielle Morquecho was named interim principal for the remainder of the school year.  In July 2016, Dr. Morquecho was appointed Principal of Hutch-Tech.

Former principals 

Previous assignment and reason for departure denoted in parentheses

Daniel Upton–1904-1909 (Teacher - Mechanic Arts High School, named Principal of State Normal School in Buffalo)
Author S. Harrell–1909-1916 (unknown, named Assistant Superintendent of Indianapolis Public Schools)
David H. Childs–1916-1935
Richard R. Dry–1935-1946 (Vice Principal - Hutchinson Central Technical High School, unknown)
C. Gordon Ryther–1946-1947 (Vice Principal - Hutchinson Central Technical High School, returned to VP post)
Martin H. Kuehn–1947-1959 (unknown, died)
Ernest Zeferjahn–1960-1971 (unknown, retired)
Russell Guest [interim]–1971 (Assistant Principal - Hutchinson Central Technical High School, retired)
Martin J. O'Donnell–1971-1974 (Principal - Grover Cleveland High School, retired)
Anthony D. Vetrano–1974-1986 (Principal - Fillmore Middle School, named Director of Vocational Education for Buffalo Public Schools)
Joseph Gentile–1986-1994 (unknown, named Principal of Clarence High School)
David M. Greco–1994-2010 (Principal - Buffalo Traditional School, retired)
Sabatino Cimato–2010-2015 (Principal - North Park Academy, named Associate Superintendent in Charge of Leadership of Buffalo Public Schools)

Clubs and extra-curricular activities
The school offers a number of extra-curricular activities. Sports teams include: football, basketball, baseball, softball, soccer, hockey, swimming, rowing, golf, and Track. The school also features a number of clubs and organizations including: Student Council, Students Against Drunk Driving, GSA (Gay-Straight Alliance), Kappa Sigma Phi, Drama Club, JROTC, Foreign Language Clubs, Engineering Organizations, Drill Team, Cheerleading and a school newspaper club. Staff-led musical instruction supports several musical groups including a jazz ensemble, concert band and marching band.

In the news
In recognition of its unique programs and past accomplishments, Hutchinson Central Technical High School was honored as a National School of Excellence in 1988-1989 by the U.S. Department of Education. In 1996, Redbook magazine cited HCTHS as one of the top 150 high schools in the country.

In October 2005, the New York Civil Liberties Union successfully pressured the school to release students from their mandatory Junior ROTC program, arguing that the practice violates the State's Education Law, which provides that no child may be enrolled in JROTC without prior written parental consent. In the end, Greco did release the student in question, and all others, but not without the attention of the local media. WGRZ, the local NBC broadcast channel, carried the story, as did the local publication Artvoice.

On November 21, 2008, John Hoffmeister, former CEO of Shell Oil in Houston, spoke to the student body about alternative energy, in an event organized by the Buffalo Urban League.

Following the theft of a student's bicycle from Hutch Tech in March 2009, the administration announced a policy that in essence banned bike riding to and from the school. The student brought the matter before the Buffalo school board, and the first bike rack at Hutch Tech was installed, contributed by a local bicycling advocacy group. The superintendent of schools expressed a desire and plan for bike racks throughout the Buffalo Public School District.

In 2009, Hutchinson Central Technical High School was ranked 86th out of 131 Western New York high schools in terms of academic performance.

In the 2011 U.S. News & World Report analysis of United States Best High Schools, Hutch Tech received a Bronze Star for exceeding state performance in its Poverty-Adjusted Performance Index, and greatly exceeding overall state average performance by its disadvantaged students. The school's college readiness score prevented receiving a higher ranking.

In the 2013 analysis of United States Best High Schools, Hutch Tech was upgraded to receive a Silver Award for far exceeding state performance in its Poverty-Adjusted Performance Index, exceeding state average performance when not Poverty-Adjusted, as well as an improved college readiness score.

On April 4, 2014, Hutchinson Central Technical High School went into lockdown after a bomb threat was posted on Facebook. However, no explosive device was found in the school and after two hours, the lockdown was lifted. The 15-year-old sophomore student that police say posted the threat was arrested.

Notable alumni
 Harold Arlen, Academy Award winning Composer most famous for writing the music for Over the Rainbow from the Wizard of Oz.
 Michael Curry, 27th presiding Bishop of the United States Episcopal Church
 Michael Bennett, Pulitzer Prize and Tony Award-winning Choreographer, (Attended for 2 years.)
 Charles Clough, Painter
 Wallace E. Cunningham, Noted Architect
 Chester A. Kowal, Buffalo mayor, 1962–1965
 Stanley M. Makowski, Buffalo mayor, 1974–1977
 Kevin Roberson, standout basketball player at the University of Vermont
 Frank A. Sedita, Buffalo mayor, 1958–1961, 1966–1973
 Clifford Stoll, Astronomer, inventor, computer security expert.
 Leonard F. Walentynowicz, Former Assistant Secretary of State

References

External links

 Official site
 Official Alumni Association
 Official History 1904-1990
 NYS Accountability and Overview Report for HCTHS 2008 – 2009 
 NYS Comprehensive Information Report for HCTHS 2008 – 2009

Public high schools in New York (state)
High schools in Buffalo, New York
Magnet schools in New York (state)
Magnet schools in Buffalo, New York
Educational institutions established in 1904
1904 establishments in New York (state)